Joseph Lee Rodgers III (born February 9, 1953) is an American psychologist and the Lois Autrey Betts Professor of Psychology and Human Development at Vanderbilt University. He is also the George Lynn Cross Research Professor Emeritus at the University of Oklahoma, where he taught from 1981 to 2012. He is a past president of the Society for the Study of Social Biology, the Society of Multivariate Experimental Psychology, and Divisions 5 and 34 of the American Psychological Association. From 2006 to 2011, he was editor-in-chief of Multivariate Behavioral Research. He received his Ph.D. in quantitative psychology from the University of North Carolina at Chapel Hill in 1981, with a minor in biostatistics. He has been a fellow of the American Association for the Advancement of Science since 2012. His substantive research has focused on topics such as the relationship between birth order and human intelligence, as well as adolescent risk behaviors, like sexual activity and drug use. His methodological research focuses on behavior genetics, exploratory data analysis, and correlation and regression.

References

External links
Faculty page

Living people
1953 births
Vanderbilt University faculty
21st-century American psychologists
University of Oklahoma faculty
University of North Carolina at Chapel Hill alumni
Academic journal editors
Fellows of the American Association for the Advancement of Science
Behavior geneticists
Quantitative psychologists
20th-century American psychologists